Podgorny is a settlement in urban okrug of Maykop, Russia. The population was 773 as of 2018. There are 9 streets.

Geography 
Podgorny is located 12 km north of Maykop (the district's administrative centre) by road. Sovetsky is the nearest rural locality.

References 

Rural localities in Maykop Federal City